Pernety is a station on line Line 13 of the Paris Métro in the 14th arrondissement.

The station opened on 21 January 1937 as part of the original line 14 between Bienvenüe and Porte de Vanves. This line became part of line 13 on 9 November 1976.
The station is named after the Rue Pernety, named after  (1766–1856), who was one of Napoleon's generals and owned the land where the street was built.

Station layout

References
Roland, Gérard (2003). Stations de métro. D’Abbesses à Wagram. Éditions Bonneton.

External links 
 

Paris Métro stations in the 14th arrondissement of Paris
Railway stations in France opened in 1937